The women's field hockey event at the 2014 Commonwealth Games was held at the Glasgow National Hockey Centre from 24 July to 2 August 2014.

Results

Preliminary round

Pool A

Pool B

Fifth to tenth place classification

Ninth and tenth place

Seventh and eighth place

Fifth and sixth place

Medal round

Semifinals

Bronze medal match

Gold medal match

Statistics

Final rankings

Goalscorers

References

2014
Women's tournament
2014 in women's field hockey
International women's field hockey competitions hosted by Scotland
2014 in Scottish women's sport